Maya is a 2012 Tamil medical soap opera that aired Monday through Friday on Jaya TV from 22 October 2012 to 16 August 2013 at 9:30PM IST. The show starred Easwari Rao, Vani Bhojan, Abhishek and Venkat among others. It was produced by Sathya Jyothi Films, written by Indira Soundarrajan and directed by B. Nityanandham.

Plot
Maya Story is a story that revolves round a doting father, his daughter Maya, her estranged mom and step brother Ramesh.

Cast
 Easwari Rao as Parameshwari
 Vani Bhojan as Maya
 Abhishek as Chanthirasekar
 Venkat 
 Mohan Raman 
 Jagadish Raman
 Mohammed Azeem as Ashwin

References

External links
official website

Jaya TV television series
2012 Tamil-language television series debuts
Tamil-language television shows
2013 Tamil-language television series endings